The Whippany River is a tributary of the Rockaway River, approximately 20 mi (30 km) long, in northern New Jersey in the United States.

It rises in Morris County, in Mendham Township west of Morristown, and flows generally ENE in a meandering course, through Morristown and the 
Whippany area of Hanover. It flows through the Troy Meadows and joins the Rockaway in the Hatfield Swamp in eastern Morris County, just above the confluence of the Rockaway with the Passaic River.

There are three USGS water gauges on the river.

The river derives its name from the Whippanong Native Americans, a tribe that once inhabited the area. Whippanong meant "place of the willows", named for the trees growing along the banks of the river.

History

Munsee Lenape 
Circa 1500, the Whippany River was part of the Lenapehoking (along with the rest of New Jersey) and was inhabited by the Munsee Lenape.
The Munsee harvested mussels from the Whippany River.

Colonial settlement 
In 1685, European settlers constructed homes along the Whippany River. The river provided the hydropower for the various mills of Whippany.

Modern history 
In 1998, the Mayor's Action Committee (later known as the Whippany River Watershed Action Committee) was established its effort to protect the watershed. The Committee is sponsored by grants from NJDEP, Victoria Foundation, Rutgers University, Pfizer, and other corporations. It is partnered with 16 local municipalities. The Committee hosts canoe trips, festivals, hikes, educational outreach, classes, civic organizations, engineering roundtables, goose workshops, and stormwater conferences. Volunteers form a significant part of its research teams and workforce.

See also
List of rivers of New Jersey
Whippany River Watershed Action Committee
Patriots' Path

Notes

References

External links

NJ Skylands: Whippany River
U.S. Geological Survey: NJ stream gauging stations
Whippany River Watershed Action Committee

Rivers of Morris County, New Jersey
Tributaries of the Passaic River
Rivers of New Jersey